is a Japanese manga series written by Tsuina Miura and illustrated by Takahiro Oba. It was serialized online in DeNA's Manga Box app from December 2013 to April 2019. Kodansha held the license to publish the series and compiled it into twenty-one tankōbon volumes, while Seven Seas Entertainment published it in two-in-one omnibus volumes in North America from June 2018 to October 2021. A sequel manga, titled High-Rise Invasion Arrive, was serialized in Kodansha's Magazine Pocket website and app from July 2019 to April 2021.

Volume lists

High-Rise Invasion

High-Rise Invasion Arrive

References

External links

 
 

High-Rise Invasion